Susie Isabel Lankford Shorter (January 4, 1859 – February 23, 1912) was an American educator, philanthropist, and writer.

Early life
Susan Isabel (or Isabella) Lankford was born in Terre Haute, Indiana, the daughter of Whitten Strange Lankford and Clarissa Carter Lankford. Her father was a minister in the African Methodist Episcopal Church. She was educated at Wilberforce University in Ohio.

Career
Susie Lankford taught for a few years before she married. As a faculty wife at Wilberforce, she ran a student store, offered a free kindergarten for local children, and provided care for sick students in her home. She was president of the Wilberforce Ladies' College Aid Society.

Shorter wrote articles for church publications. Her booklet "Heroines of African Methodism" (1891) was written to celebrate the eightieth birthday of Bishop Daniel Payne. "We are proud of our women," she wrote. "Little has been written concerning them. They are walking in all life's avenues successfully, daring and doing what the women of other varieties of the human race dare and do." She also wrote a column, "Plain Talk to Our Girls", for Ringwood's Afro-American Journal of Fashion, published by Julia Ringwood Coston.

She wrote the song, "Lifting as We Climb", for the Ohio chapter of the National Association of Colored Women's Clubs.

Personal life
Susie Isabel Lankford married Joseph Proctor Shorter, a professor at Wilberforce University, in 1878. They had eight children together; at least three of their children died before reaching their teens. Susie Lankford Shorter was widowed in 1910 and died in 1912, aged 53 years.

References

External links
Susan Isabella Lankford Shorter's Ohio gravesite, at Find a Grave.

1859 births
1912 deaths
African-American women writers
African-American educators
People from Terre Haute, Indiana
Wilberforce University alumni
Educators from Indiana
American women educators
20th-century African-American people
20th-century African-American women